Francesco Aprile (1657 in Carona – 1710 in Turin), was an Italian sculptor and stucco artist, born in what is now Switzerland, and mainly active in Turin, the Duchy of Savoy, but also Rome.

Francesco and his brother Alessandro trained under the sculptor Carlo Alessandro. In 1690, he labored in the Sindone Chapel with Paolo Cortesi, in making the highly ornate marble pavement. Francesco's two sons: Francesco Junior (born 1688) and Giuseppe (born 1694) also became sculptors.

In 1691, he participated in the decoration of the chapel for the Blessed Amadeus IX, Duke of Savoy in the Vercelli Cathedral, based on designs by Michelangelo Garove of Bissone. Alongside Secondo Casella and Francesco Piazzoli he was called to redecorated the rooms of the future Queen Anne Marie d'Orléans. He built furniture of marble for the display of plates inherited by the future Queen. In 1694, he built the balustrade for the main altar of the church of the Santissima Trinità in via Dora Grossa. In Turin in 1709, he signs a contract to build the main altar for the church of the Holy Spirit in Carignano; the altar holds an altarpiece painted by Gerolamo Pesci.

References
Vera Comolli Mandracci, Luganensium Artistarum Universitas. L'archivio e i luoghi della Compagnia di Sant'Anna tra Lugano e Torino, Lugano 1992.
Maria Vittoria Cattaneo, Nadia Ostorero, L'archivio della Compagnia di Sant'Anna dei Luganesi in Torino. Una fonte documentaria per lo studio dei cantieri e delle maestranze per architettura e decorazione nel Piemonte sabaudo, Turin 2006.
Andrea Spiriti, Artisti e architetti svizzeri a Torino. Le ragioni della continuità, in Giorgio Mollisi (a cura di), Svizzeri a Torino nella storia, nell'arte, nella cultura, nell'economia dal Cinquecento ad oggi, «Arte&Storia», year 11, number 52, October 2011, Edizioni Ticino Management, Lugano 2011, 56–65.
Laura Facchin, Gli Aprile di Carona. Una presenza secolare nello Stato sabaudo, in Giorgio Mollisi (a cura di), Svizzeri a Roma nella storia, nell'arte, nella cultura, nell'economia dal Cinquecento ad oggi, «Arte&Storia», year 11, number 52, October 2011, Edizioni Ticino Management, Lugano 2011, 212–225.

1657 births
1691 deaths
17th-century Italian sculptors
Italian male sculptors
Italian Baroque sculptors
Swiss Baroque sculptors